George Emerson Leach (July 14, 1876 – July 17, 1955) was an American politician who served as a major general in the United States Army and two-time Republican Mayor of Minneapolis.

Early life 
George Emerson Leach was born in Cedar Rapids, Iowa on July 14, 1876, and was raised in Minneapolis. He attended Central High School in Minneapolis. After graduating from the University of Minnesota Law School in 1897, he began a career in insurance.

Career

Military
In April 1905, he was commissioned as a Second lieutenant of Field Artillery in the Minnesota National Guard. Leach advanced through the ranks of the military in command and staff assignments. He graduated from the United States Army Command and General Staff College in 1916.  In 1916-7, he saw active duty on the United States–Mexico border during the Pancho Villa Expedition; first as a Major, and later as Colonel and Commander of the 151st Artillery Regiment.

During World War I, Leach commanded the 151st Field Artillery Regiment, a unit of the 42nd Infantry Division. He took part in battles at Champagne-Marne, Aisne-Marne, St. Mihiel, and Meuse-Argonne. Leach remained in command of the 151st Field Artillery until November 1921, after which he returned to the insurance business as manager of the St. Paul Fire & Marine Insurance Company.

In 1923, Leach was promoted to brigadier general as commander of Minnesota's 59th Field Artillery Brigade. In 1931, he was appointed Chief of the National Guard Bureau and was promoted to Major General. He served in this position until 1935, after which he returned to command of the 59th Field Artillery Brigade, reverting to his permanent rank of Brigadier General. In 1937, he was elected President of the National Guard Association of the United States.

From 1940 until his retirement in 1941, Leach was commander of the 34th Infantry Division, again receiving promotion to Major General. Under his command the division was activated and began its initial preparations and training for entry into World War II.

After the war, Leach operated a vending machine company, George E. Leach, Inc., and was Chairman of the National Automatic Merchandising Association.

Political
In June 1921, Leach was elected Mayor of Minneapolis.  He stood for election as a conservative, and was re-elected in 1923. During his second term, Leach's opponents accused him of being a communist because he opposed private ownership of a hydroelectric dam on the Mississippi River.

At the same time, the Ku Klux Klan (KKK) was growing in Minnesota within the ranks of several fraternal orders, primarily the Masons and Shriners. Leach was a member of several such organizations, and the Klan initially regarded him as a de facto ally but later considered him an adversary because he had appointed a Catholic as his secretary and had dined with the Knights of Columbus.  The Klan also disliked Leach because he prevented police officers from joining the Klan and because he launched an investigation into Klan activity at the University of Minnesota. The KKK fielded its Exalted Cyclops, Roy Miner, as a mayoral candidate against Leach in 1923. Miner campaigned on elimination of illegal gambling and vice, which he said Leach abetted. The KKK found a woman in a local jail who said she had had an affair with Leach, and publicized this in an effort to enmesh Leach in a scandal. A grand jury decided the story of the affair was criminally libelous. The case went to trial; Floyd B. Olson handled the prosecution against five KKK leaders.  The witness said she had lied about Leach, who denied both the affair and the charges of protecting vice and gambling. The all-Protestant jury found the defendants guilty and sentenced them to prison.  Leach won a landslide re-election against the KKK's stand-in for Miner, Senator William A. Campbell.

In 1926, Leach was an unsuccessful candidate for the Republican nomination for Governor.  He was re-elected mayor in 1927, but was defeated for re-election in 1929. In 1937, he was again elected mayor.  He was an unsuccessful candidate for the Republican nomination for Governor of Minnesota in 1938.  He was re-elected mayor in 1939, and served until 1941.

Amateur sports affiliation
Leach was an avid skier.  In 1924 he managed the U.S. Olympic Ski Team, and he was the National Ski Association's representative to the 1924 convention which led to the creation of the International Ski Federation.

Death
Leach died in Los Angeles, California on July 17, 1955.  He was buried at Fort Snelling National Cemetery, Section D.S., Site 65-N.

Awards and legacy
Leach's awards included the Distinguished Service Cross, Distinguished Service Medal and Purple Heart in addition to other service and achievement awards. The George E. Leach Range and Leach Avenue at Camp Ripley, a Minnesota National Guard training facility, are named for him.

Leach was posthumously named to the U.S. Ski and Snowboard Hall of Fame.

Ribbon bar

References

External links

1876 births
1955 deaths
United States Army Field Artillery Branch personnel
Politicians from Cedar Rapids, Iowa
University of Minnesota Law School alumni
Military personnel from Minneapolis
Minnesota Republicans
United States Army personnel of World War I
United States Army personnel of World War II
United States Army generals
National Guard (United States) generals
United States Army Command and General Staff College alumni
Recipients of the Distinguished Service Cross (United States)
Recipients of the Distinguished Service Medal (US Army)
Officiers of the Légion d'honneur
Recipients of the Croix de Guerre 1914–1918 (France)
Chiefs of the National Guard Bureau
Mayors of Minneapolis
Central High School (Minneapolis, Minnesota) alumni
Conservatism in the United States
Military personnel from Iowa